Cathepsin D is a protein that in humans is encoded by the CTSD gene. This gene encodes a lysosomal aspartyl protease composed of a protein dimer of disulfide-linked heavy and light chains, both produced from a single protein precursor. Cathepsin D is an aspartic endo-protease that is ubiquitously distributed in lysosomes. The main function of cathepsin D is to degrade proteins and activate precursors of bioactive proteins in pre-lysosomal compartments. This proteinase, which is a member of the peptidase A1 family, has a specificity similar to but narrower than that of pepsin A. Transcription of the CTSD gene is initiated from several sites, including one that is a start site for an estrogen-regulated transcript. Mutations in this gene are involved in the pathogenesis of several diseases, including breast cancer and possibly Alzheimer disease. Homozygous deletion of the CTSD gene leads to early lethality in the postnatal phase. Deficiency of CTSD gene has been reported an underlying cause of neuronal ceroid lipofuscinosis (NCL).

Structure

Gene
The CTSD gene is located at chromosome 11.

Protein
The catalytic sites of cathepsin D include two critical aspartic residues (amino acid 33 and 231) located on the 14 kDa and 34kDa chains. The ultimate form of mature cathepsin D is composed of 337 amino acid residues, 196 amino acid residues in the heavy chain and 141 in the light chain. These two chains are linked by the hydrophobic effect.

Function 

The optimum pH for cathepsin D in vitro is 4.5-5.0. Cathepsin-D is an aspartic protease that depends critically on protonation of its active site Asp residue. Along with Asp-protonation, lower pH also leads to conformational switch in cathepsin-D : the N-terminal segment of the protease moves out of the active site as pH drops. Similar to other aspartic proteases, cathepsin D accommodates up to 8 amino acid residues in the binding cleft of the active site. The main physiological functions of cathepsin D consist of metabolic degradation of intracellular proteins, activation and degradation of polypeptide hormones and growth factors, activation of enzymatic precursors, processing of enzyme activators and inhibitors, brain antigen processing and regulation of programmed cell death. Cathepsin D can also be found in the extracellular space and it is one of the few cathepsins, that shows some activity at neutral pH. It is able to activate the growth factors VEGF-C and VEGF-D, which might partly explain its relevance for tumor progression.

Clinical significance

The NCLs present with progressive loss of visual function and neurodevelopmental decline, seizure, myoclonic jerks and premature death. The CTSD gene is one of the identified eight genes the deficiency of which is responsible for NCLs. It has been reported that a homozygous single nucleotide duplication in exon 6 could alter the reading frame and causes a premature stop codon at position 255. Over-expression of cathepsin D stimulates tumorigenicity and metastasis as well as initiation of tumor apoptosis. This protease has been regarded an independent marker of poor prognosis in breast cancer being correlated with the incidence of clinical metastasis. Knock-out of CTSD gene would cause intestinal necrosis and hemorrhage and increase apoptosis in thymus, indicating that cathepsin D is required in certain epithelial cells for tissue remodeling and renewal.  It is also reported that there might be a strong effect for CTSD genotype on Alzheimer disease risk in male. Cathepsin D enzymatic activity induces hydrolytic modification of apolipoprotein B-100-containing lipoproteins, including LDL, which means it may be involved in atherosclerosis as well.

Interaction

Pepstatin 
Transglutaminase 2
HEBP1
A2M
Ceramide

References

Further reading

External links 
 The MEROPS online database for peptidases and their inhibitors: A01.009
  GeneReviews/NIH/NCBI/UW entry on Neuronal Ceroid-Lipofuscinoses
 PDBe-KB provides an overview of all the structure information available in the PDB for Human Cathepsin D

Proteases
EC 3.4.23
Cathepsins